Ahmad Jalali  (born 1949 in Shahroud) is an Iranian scholar and philosopher.

He authored a dozen articles in social, cultural, historical, philosophical, political and international fields. Jalali was instrumental in registering five Iranian sites as World Heritage Site in UNESCO.

Education
Mechanical Engineering, Shiraz University (BA),
Philosophy, Tehran University (MA),
Political Philosophy, University of Oxford (PhD).

Positions
Teaching Fellow, University of Manchester, Department of Middle Eastern Studies, Manchester, United Kingdom (1991–92)
Fellow, Oriental Studies and Academic Member, Department of Persian Studies, Oriental Institute, University of Oxford, United Kingdom (1992–97).
Ambassador and Permanent Delegate of Iran to UNESCO (1997–2006)
Chairperson, Programme Commission I, 29th Session of the General Conference (1997)
Chairperson, Roundtable on Youth, 29th Session of the General Conference (1997)
Representative of Iran to the Executive Board of UNESCO (1999–2001)
Chairperson, Fourth Regional Group, Asia and the Pacific, UNESCO (1999)
Co-organizer and contributor to many UNESCO-sponsored conferences focusing on Dialogue between Islamic and European Civilizations
Member, Council of United Nations University (UNU) (2001–07)
President of the 31st General Conference of UNESCO (2001–03) 
President of the World Heritage Convention General Assembly of UNESCO (2003–04)
Head of the Iranian Parliament Library, Museum and Documentation Center and Cultural Consultant of the Iranian Parliament Speaker (2007–08)
Ambassador and Permanent Delegate of Iran to UNESCO (2013–21)

Publications/Writings

Notes

See also
Intellectual movements in Iran

Academics of the University of Manchester
Iranian writers
Shiraz University alumni
University of Tehran alumni
Alumni of the University of Oxford
UNESCO officials
People from Shahrud, Iran
Living people
Permanent Delegates of Iran to UNESCO
1949 births
Council of the Islamic Revolution members
Iranian officials of the United Nations